Trichoglottis mindanaensis is a species of epiphytic orchid endemic to the Philippines growing at elevations of 60 to 1,500 meters above sea level. The species was first found on trees overhanging a tidal stream in island of Mindanao in Zamboanga peninsula, hence the specific epithet. The orchid is widely distributed throughout the Philippine archipelago and can also be found in islands of Luzon, Panay and Samar.

References

External links

Endemic orchids of the Philippines
Orchids of the Philippines
Plants described in 1914
mindanaensis